Small Castes are not Castes, they are Professions. After the Indian Rebellion of 1857, the British occupied the whole Indian subcontinent. They introduced a new policy of divide and rule to sustain their occupation in this region. According to this policy, society was divided into two parts, i.e. agricultural and non-agricultural castes. The skilled and educated persons of the community were designated as small castes, or non-agricultural castes. Their real castes were removed from the records and the profession was avowed as their caste.

Feudal system
This was a feudal system made to keep the youth of society away from learning such skills. According to this system the skilled persons became slaves to the feudal landlords and the agricultural castes, who were rewarded with lands and territories as they were loyal to Britain rather than their own people.  The assets of these skilled persons were seized or awarded to feudal Chiefs and their relatives. The people belonging to these castes were deprived of some rights like government jobs, sale and purchase of property (exceeding a particular limit), education, etc. Due to this act the respectable became the most reviled in the society. Their profession became their caste for more than two centuries. So the title of small caste was given by the British to the skilled persons of the society belonging to the major castes of the society.

After independence
Although the British left after 1947, this plant is rooted so deep that it has had bitter effects till now. It is supposed to be the major cause of division in Pakistani society. But after Independence from the British and Dogra Rules the AJK Government has changed this policy by announcing equal rights. Members of these Castes were also allowed to enlist with their real caste.

List of small castes
The following Castes were included in Small Castes:
Tarhan: Carpenters
Qamyar: Potters
Lowar: Will forge
Kassaï: Butchers
Mirassi: Travelling musicians, troubadours
Mautchi: Shoemakers
Tobi: Launderers
Darzi: Dressmakers
Jalaye: Tisserands
Lahari: Dyers
Mashqi: Water carriers
Teli: Oil Tycoons
Balwalai: Messengers
Naï: Hairdressers; they are also able to make small operations, they circumcise the newborn ones and are cooks during the festivals and the marriages

References

Caste system in India